Usta Usta is a Polish comedy-drama television series based on the British series Cold Feet. It ran on TVN for three seasons from March 6, 2010 to May 3, 2011. Fourth season ran on TVN from September 6, 2020.

Cast members

External links
 

Polish television shows
2010 Polish television series debuts
2011 Polish television series endings
2020 Polish television series debuts
TVN (Polish TV channel) original programming